Drifters is a 2011 Italian drama film directed by Matteo Rovere. It is based on the 1990 novel Gli sfiorati by Sandro Veronesi.

Plot
For the young Méte, a graphologist fascinated by the psychology hidden behind writing, it's an embarrassing and difficult situation having to take care of his half-sister Belinda, a seventeen-year-old teenager in the balance between everything and nothing, during the second marriage of Méte's father (the only thing the two have in common).  To avoid the situation, Méte pretends to be mostly busy with Damiano, a womanizer friend, and Bruno, colleague and separated father. But Méte must eventually face his half-sister, a subject hitherto only grazed.

Cast 

 Andrea Bosca as Méte
 Miriam Giovanelli as Belinda
 Claudio Santamaria as  Bruno
 Michele Riondino as  Damiano
 Massimo Popolizio as Sergio
 Aitana Sánchez-Gijón as  Virna
 Asia Argento as Beatrice

See also 
List of Italian films of 2011
Genetic sexual attraction

References

External links

2011 films
Italian drama films
2011 drama films
Films directed by Matteo Rovere
Incest in film
Films about siblings
Films based on Italian novels
Films based on works by Sandro Veronesi
2010s Italian films
Fandango (Italian company) films